Plymouth City Council is the unitary authority for Plymouth, Devon, England. It has traditionally been controlled by Labour or the Conservatives. The council is currently in a state of no overall control, with the Conservatives governing as a minority administration.

The council is run using the leader and cabinet model, where the leader of the council—normally the leader of the majority party—is selected by fellow councillors, who also select the executive, commonly referred to as the cabinet. The current leader of the council is Richard Bingley of the Conservative Party and the opposition group leader is Tudor Evans of the Labour Party.

History
Plymouth was recorded as a borough from 1276 and was incorporated in 1439. In April 1889, as a result of the reform of local government by the Local Government Act 1888, Plymouth became a self-administering county borough. In 1914, the Borough of Plymouth was united with the adjoining boroughs of Devonport and Stonehouse and in 1928, became a city by royal charter. In 1971, a Local Government White Paper was published which would have led to Plymouth, a town of 250,000 people, being administered by a council based at Exeter, a smaller city on the other side of Devon. This led to Plymouth lobbying for the creation of a new county of "Tamarside", to include Plymouth, Torpoint, Saltash, and their rural hinterland. This campaign was unsuccessful, and on 1 April 1974, Plymouth surrendered control of several areas to Devon County Council.

This continued until 1 April 1998, when, under the recommendations of the Banham Commission, Plymouth was designated to become a unitary authority, and Plymouth City Council was established.

Coat of arms

The coat of arms of the City of Plymouth show the four towers of the old Plymouth Castle, with the saltire of Saint Andrew, who is the patron of Plymouth's oldest church. The crest is a blue naval crown with a red anchor held in a lion's paw. The crown and anchor were part of the crest of the former County Borough of Devonport and represent the importance of the Royal Navy in the life of the city. The Latin motto, Turris Fortissima est Nomen Jehova, means "The name of Jehovah is the strongest tower".

Powers and functions
Plymouth City Council appoints four members to the Devon and Somerset Combined Fire Authority. It is also responsible for arranging local elections and those for three Parliamentary constituencies: Plymouth Moor View; Plymouth, Sutton and Devonport; and South West Devon.

Elections

Elections to Plymouth City Council take place in May, for three years out of every four. Elected councillors serve terms of four years and the council is split into thirds, with one third elected each year except the "fallow" year.

The council is traditionally dominated by the Labour and Conservative parties, with independents and the Liberal Democrats rarely winning seats.

At present, the Conservatives have 23 councillors, Labour have 25 councillors, the Green party has 3 councillors and there are 6 independent councillors, 5 of whom form the Independent Alliance Group (a local group of councillors, not a political party).

Lord Mayoralty

Plymouth has had a mayor in some form since 1439, and this tradition continued until 1934, when the king granted Plymouth the honour of having a Lord Mayor.

The role of the Lord Mayor is largely ceremonial, and has evolved into a figurehead position which is the public, non-political image of Plymouth City Council. The Lord Mayor chairs council meetings in the Council Chamber. The position usually rotates between the Conservatives and Labour, and is chosen on the third Friday of May. The Lord Mayor chooses the Deputy Lord Mayor.

The Lord Mayor's official residence is 3 Elliot Terrace, on Hoe. Once a home of Waldorf and Nancy Astor, it was given by Lady Astor to the City of Plymouth as an official residence for future Lord Mayors and is also used today for civic hospitality, as lodgings for visiting dignitaries and High Court judges, and is available to hire for private events. The Civic Centre municipal office building in Armada Way became a listed building in June 2007 because of its quality and period features. The Council sold the building to developers Urban Splash in 2015, and staff have moved into new accommodation elsewhere in the city. It has retained the adjacent Council House, where it continues to hold its meetings.

Councillors
Elected members of the council hold office for four years and are elected "by thirds", meaning that most of the council's electoral areas have three councillors each and elections for one councillor per area are held in three years out of four. If an area has only two councillors, elections are held in two years out of four. The current councillors for Plymouth City are as follows:

* Denotes cabinet member

** Denotes the council leader

† Denotes the leader of the opposition

Notes

References

Unitary authority councils of England
Local education authorities in England
Local authorities in Devon
Billing authorities in England
Leader and cabinet executives
Plymouth, Devon